Hypostomus soniae is a species of catfish in the family Loricariidae. It is native to South America, where it occurs in the Tapajós basin in the state of Pará in Brazil. The species reaches 16.4 cm (6.5 inches) in standard length. Its specific epithet, soniae, honors Sonia Fisch-Muller, a curator at the Museum of Geneva specializing in loricariid systematics who collected the type material.

H. soniae appears in the aquarium trade, where it is typically referred to either as the blue-eyed redfin pleco or by its associated L-number, which is L-137.

References 

Fish described in 2005